John Murray Forbes (1771 – June 14, 1831) was an American diplomat. He served as the Chargé d'Affaires to the Republic of Buenos Aires from 1825 to 1831.

Early life
John Murray Forbes was born in 1771.

Career
Forbes served as American consul in Copenhagen, Hamburg and Statin from 1801 to 1819. He owned the country house America outside Copenhagen and constructed an American-style windmill known as America Mill at the site in 1814.

He served as the Chargé d'Affaires to the Republic of Buenos Aires (later United States Ambassador to Argentina) from 1825 to 1831.

Later career
In 1825 he was elected a Fellow of the American Academy of Arts and Sciences and a member of the American Antiquarian Society.

Death
Forbes died on June 14, 1831, in Buenos Aires.

References

External links
 John Murray Forbes papers

1771 births
1831 deaths
Ambassadors of the United States to Argentina
Fellows of the American Academy of Arts and Sciences
John Murray
Members of the American Antiquarian Society
19th-century American diplomats